Benjamin M. Stephens (November 27, 1916 - April 6, 1966) was an American professional basketball player.

A 6'0" guard/forward from the University of Iowa, Stephens played three seasons (1939–1942) in the National Basketball League as a member of the Akron Wingfoots. He led the league in scoring during the 1940-41 season with an 11.0 points per game average. His basketball career was interrupted by World War II, during which he served in the United States Navy. After the war, Stephens worked for Goodyear Tire and Rubber Company before dying of a heart attack while on vacation in the U.S. Virgin Islands in 1966.

References

1916 births
1966 deaths
Akron Goodyear Wingfoots players
American men's basketball players
United States Navy personnel of World War II
Forwards (basketball)
Guards (basketball)
Iowa Hawkeyes men's basketball players